Gianfranco Grasselli (born 28 May 1950) is an Italian rower. He competed in the men's eight event at the 1972 Summer Olympics.

References

1950 births
Living people
Italian male rowers
Olympic rowers of Italy
Rowers at the 1972 Summer Olympics
Place of birth missing (living people)